Computers and Blues is the fifth studio album by English rapper and producer Mike Skinner, under the music project The Streets. It was officially released in the United Kingdom on 7 February 2011. It contains 14 songs, including an appearance from British singer-songwriter Clare Maguire. Rob Harvey of The Music worked closely with Skinner on the album and features on several songs. The cover photo is a close-up of the Ziggurats, Norfolk Terrace halls of residence at the University of East Anglia designed by architect Denys Lasdun. The 'Blues' part of the title refers to Skinner's beloved Birmingham City.

Composition 
In contrast to the "self-indulgent meltdown" of The Hardest Way to Make an Easy Living (2006) and the ""philosophy for beginners" approach" of Everything Is Borrowed (2008), Computers and Blues returns to the garage instrumentals and "everyman" presentation of real life of Original Pirate Material (2002) and A Grand Don't Come for Free (2004). It is primarily about technology's control on society, such as romantic dates on Facebook and addiction to Xbox gaming. Although Skinner sometimes raps about topics typical of his earliest albums, such as drinking ("Without Thinking") and being a stoner ("Roof Of Your Car"), he also discusses issues unique to his later years, such as struggling with chronic fatigue syndrome ("Trying To Kill M.E.") and seeing his daughter's ultrasound ("Blip On A Screen"). Occasionally, the rapper references science fiction writer J. G. Ballard. As Skinner laments on "Puzzled By People", "You can’t Google the solutions to people’s problems."

Reception 

Sean O'Neal of The A.V. Club argued that despite some moments that "remind that he won't be easily replaced", most of Computers and Blues suffered from "rote rehash" in the lyrics, and "awkward nods to trends from a guy who once sought to push things forward", such as Auto-tuned hooks and references to internet lingo like "OMG".

Track listing

Chart performance
On 10 February 2011, Computers and Blues debuted at number 22 on the Irish Albums Chart. On 13 February 2011 the album entered the UK Albums Chart at number 8. As of January 2012 UK sales stand at 42,000 copies according to The Guardian.

Release history
The album was released in the United Kingdom on 7 February 2011, but was made available to Spotify Premium subscribers on 2 February. A stream of the album was made available by Guardian News and Media on 3 February 2011.

References

2011 albums
679 Artists albums
Albums produced by Mike Skinner (musician)
The Streets albums